Catoptria staudingeri is a species of moth in the family Crambidae described by Philipp Christoph Zeller in 1863. It is found in France, Spain, Portugal and on Sicily.

The wingspan is about 19 mm.

The larvae feed on moss species.

References

Moths described in 1863
Crambini
Moths of Europe